Brian Gaynor (born 1973) is an Irish retired hurler who played as a right wing-back for the Tipperary senior team.

Gaynor joined the team during the 1995–95 National League and was a regular member of the team for just three seasons. During that time he failed to claim any honours at senior level.

At club level Gaynor played with the Kilruane MacDonagh's club.

References

1973 births
Living people
Kilruane MacDonaghs hurlers
Tipperary inter-county hurlers